Cornelius Scipio may refer to:

 Gnaeus Cornelius Scipio Calvus
 Lucius Cornelius Scipio (disambiguation)
 Publius Cornelius Scipio (disambiguation)
 Servius Cornelius Scipio Salvidienus Orfitus

See also
 Scipio (disambiguation)